Blepharomastix crusalis is a moth in the family Crambidae. It was described by Herbert Druce in 1895. It is found in Veracruz, Mexico.

The wingspan is about 25 mm. The forewings and hindwings are pale fawn. The forewings edged with brown along the costal margin. There is a spot in the cell and there are three dark brown bands crossing the wing. The hindwings are crossed by two brown bands, the marginal line is spotted with brown.

References

Moths described in 1895
Blepharomastix